Kyrle may refer to:
Cosmo Kyrle Bellew (1883–1948), British film actor
Kyrle Bellew (1850–1911), English stage and silent film actor
James Kyrle MacCurdy (1875–1923), British theater actor
James Kyrle-Money (1775–1843), British soldier
John Kyrle (1637–1724), English philanthropist
Josef Kyrle (1880–1926), Austrian pathologist
Martha Kyrle (1917–2017), Austrian physician
Roger Money-Kyrle (1898–1980), English psychoanalyst
Rowland Money-Kyrle (1866–1928), English archdeacon
Walter Kyrle (1600–1650), English politician

See also
 John Kyrle High School
 Kyrle disease
 John Kyrle (disambiguation)